This is a list of defunct airlines of Ghana.

See also

 List of airlines of Ghana
 List of airports in Ghana

References

Ghana
Airlines
Airlines, defunct